Algibacter psychrophilus is a Gram-negative, rod-shaped, aerobic, psychrophilic and non-motile bacterium from the genus of Algibacter which has been isolated from sediments from the Ross Sea.

References

Flavobacteria
Bacteria described in 2015